WLKX-FM (95.9 MHz) is a commercial radio station licensed to Forest Lake, Minnesota, and serving the northern suburbs of the Twin Cities.  It is owned by Lakes Broadcasting, a private corporation owned by the Peters family, who are primarily Christian-based broadcasters.  Their holdings include  including WQPM in Princeton, KLCI in Elk River, KASM and KDDG in Albany.

The station airs a classic country radio format and has an effective radiated power (ERP) of 6,000 watts.

History
The station previously aired Contemporary Christian music along with national and local religious leaders broadcasting a Christian talk and teaching format.  The station briefly simulcast with its sister station south of the metro area, KBGY.

When St. Paul-based KNOF switched to a music-only format in 2007, many syndicated and local religious spoken word programs that had used KNOF to air their broadcasts in the Twin-Cities market moved their programming to WLKX-FM.

The WLKX call letters have been with the station for several decades, and in the past, the station has programmed adult contemporary and country music formats.

On October 15, 2013, WLKX changed its format to a hybrid Regional Mexican/Tropical music format, branded as "La Neta".

On October 1, 2015, WLKX-FM changed to oldies, branded as "The Big Q", simulcasting WQPM 1300 AM Princeton, Minnesota.
The station was also heard on the HD-3 of KLCI 106.1 in Albertville, and KDDG 105.5 in Albany.

On September 13, 2018, WLKX-FM switched from oldies to classic hits, branded as "Killer Bee Radio".

On December 21, 2019, the station began stunting with Christmas music by country musicians, and promoted that "big changes" would occur on January 1, 2020.

On January 1, 2020, the station returned to its oldies format, known once again as "The Big Q".

In July 2021, the station completed an upgrade from 3,000 watts to 6,000 watts. This improved coverage in the north metro. Short-spaced KQCL, also on 95.9 in Faribault completed an upgrade to 6,000 watts at the same time. In certain locations of the Twin Cities, the two stations interfere with each other. 

On February 13, 2022, WLKX changed their format from oldies to a simulcast of classic country-formatted KLCI 106.1 FM Elk River, branded as "TOTAL Country BOB-FM".

Previous logos

References and notes

External links

Radio stations in Minnesota
Classic country radio stations in the United States